Longbridge is an area of Birmingham, England.

Longbridge may also refer to the following places in England:

 Longbridge Deverill, Wiltshire, a village and civil parish
 Longbridge Interchange, junction 15 of the M40 motorway
 Longbridge plant, an industrial site in Birmingham
 Longbridge railway station, Birmingham
 A ward in the London Borough of Barking and Dagenham

See also 
 
 Long Bridge (disambiguation)
 Longridge (disambiguation)